Laura Vaughan is professor of urban form and society at the Bartlett School of Architecture, University College London. In 2018 she appeared on BBC Radio 4's Thinking Aloud to discuss her book Mapping Society: The Spatial Dimensions of Social Cartography.

Selected publications
 Suburban Urbanities: Suburbs and the Life of the High Street. UCL Press, London, 2015. (Edited) (free pdf download)
 Mapping Society: The Spatial Dimensions of Social Cartography. UCL Press, London, 2018. (free pdf download)

References

External links 
Mapping Urban Form and Society

Living people
Year of birth missing (living people)
Academics of University College London